Karqayin was a region and a family of the old Armenia c. 400–800.

In c. 483 it was ruled by Vasavurt.

See also
List of regions of old Armenia

Early medieval Armenian regions